Arlene Limas (born February 9, 1966) is an American taekwondo practitioner and multiple international gold medalist of Mexican and Polish descent.

Early life and education
Limas  graduated with honors from Whitney Young Magnet High School in Chicago and studied political science at De Paul University in 1990.

Career
Limas made history when she became the first American to win a gold medal at the 24th Olympic Games in Seoul, Korea in taekwondo, which made its Olympic debut as an exhibition sport. She is a member of the Taekwondo Hall of Fame. Limas was inducted June 20, 2019 into the National Polish-American Sports Hall of Fame located in Troy, Michigan.

Career achievements

 1986 - World University Championships, Gold Medalist (Berkeley, California)
 1987 - National Championships Gold Medalist
 1988 - Olympic Team Member (Tae Kwon Do)
 1988 - Olympic Gold Medalist - Welterweight Division, Seoul, Korea
 1990 - National Championships Gold Medalist
 1989,1990 - Olympic Sports Festival Captain (West Team) and gold medalist
 1990 - Pan-Am Tae Kwon Do Championships (Puerto Rico) Gold Medalist
 1990 - World University Games (Spain) Team Captain & Gold Medalist
 1990 - World Cup Gold Medalist (Spain)
 1991 - National Championships Welterweight Gold Medalist
 1991 - Olympic Festival Gold Medalist
 1991 - World Championships Gold Medalist (Athens, Greece)
 1989 - National Championships Gold Medalist
 1998 - U.S. Team Trials Silver Medalist
 1998 - Olympic Weight Division Qualifier Gold Medalist
 1998 - Choson Cup Olympic Weight Division Invitational Gold Medalist, (Australia)
 1998 - Pan Am Games Team Trials Silver Medalist
 1999 - U.S. Team Trials Gold Medalist

Career honors
 2007 - Taekwondo Hall of Fame
 1987 - Collegiate Athlete of the Year
 1989 - March of Dimes Amateur Athlete of the Year
 1989 - Named "Woman of Vision" - Latin Women's Organization for Business Professional Involvement
 1991 - U. S. Taekwondo Union "Woman of the Year"
 2000 - Selected as one of the top TKD fighters of the 20th century by TKD Times and Martial Arts Illustrated
 2011 - Owner and founder of "Power Kix Martial Arts" Tae Kwon Do studio in Stafford, Virginia

References

External links

American female taekwondo practitioners
American sportspeople of Mexican descent
1966 births
Living people
Sportspeople from Chicago
Whitney M. Young Magnet High School alumni
DePaul University alumni
Place of birth missing (living people)
Taekwondo practitioners at the 1988 Summer Olympics
Medalists at the 1988 Summer Olympics
Olympic gold medalists for the United States in taekwondo
World Taekwondo Championships medalists
American people of Polish descent
21st-century American women